Saltillo is a city in Lee County, Mississippi, located in the northern part of the Tupelo micropolitan area. The population was 4,922 at the 2020 Census.

Geography

Demographics

2020 census

As of the 2020 United States Census, there were 4,922 people, 1,839 households, and 1,151 families residing in the city.

2000 census
As of the census of 2000, there were 3,393 people, 1,361 households, and 974 families residing in the town. The population density was 389.5 people per square mile (150.4/km2). There were 1,453 housing units at an average density of 166.8 per square mile (64.4/km2). The racial makeup of the town was 93.93% White, 4.69% African American, 0.06% Native American, 0.47% Asian, 0.03% Pacific Islander, 0.09% from other races, and 0.74% from two or more races. Hispanic or Latino of any race were 0.59% of the population.

There were 1,361 households, out of which 38.3% had children under the age of 18 living with them, 57.0% were married couples living together, 10.9% had a female householder with no husband present, and 28.4% were non-families. 25.6% of all households were made up of individuals, and 8.4% had someone living alone who was 65 years of age or older. The average household size was 2.45 and the average family size was 2.94.

In the town the population was spread out, with 26.9% under the age of 18, 9.0% from 18 to 24, 34.0% from 25 to 44, 19.2% from 45 to 64, and 10.8% who were 65 years of age or older. The median age was 33 years. For every 100 females, there were 87.9 males. For every 100 females age 18 and over, there were 86.0 males.

The median income for a household in the town was $35,912, and the median income for a family was $44,018. Males had a median income of $33,333 versus $23,542 for females. The per capita income for the town was $16,177. About 8.5% of families and 12.7% of the population were below the poverty line, including 13.7% of those under age 18 and 17.3% of those age 65 or over.

Education
Most of Saltillo is served by the Lee County School District while a portion is in the Tupelo School District. The former operates Saltillo High School. The sole high school of the latter is Tupelo High School.

Notable people
Andy Dillard, baseball player
Steve Dillard (born 1951), American baseball player
Tim Dillard (born 1983), American baseball player
James Gilreath (1936–2003), American musician
Kathryn Kelly, convicted bootlegger. Fourth wife of Machine Gun Kelly.
Trent Kelly, member of the United States House of Representatives from Mississippi's 1st congressional district
Merle Taylor (1927–1987), American musician

See also
List of municipalities in Mississippi
National Register of Historic Places listings in Lee County, Mississippi

References

External links

Lee – Itawamba Library System at SirsiDynix

1870 establishments in Mississippi
Cities in Lee County, Mississippi
Cities in Mississippi
Cities in Tupelo micropolitan area
Populated places established in 1870